This is a timeline of the major events in the history of Harrisburg, Pennsylvania and vicinity.

Early America
1608   Captain John Smith was recorded making contact with the Susquehannock Indians while journeying up the Susquehanna River.
Late 1600s French trader Peter Bisaillon, located at the mouth of Paxton Creek, was among the first Europeans to scout the land. Once the Native Americans began to fear the settlers, Bisaillon acted as a principal interpreter at Indian conferences, and would relocate with the remaining French traders to Ohio.  
1719 	Harrisburg settled as trading post by John Harris, Sr., settler from Yorkshire, England
1766   John Harris, Jr.. constructs a permanent stone home, still standing at 219 South Front Street
1789   Harrisburg's first Newspaper, The Harrisburgh Journal and the Weekly Advertiser, is first published on September 9 by T. Roberts & Co. for a $2 annual subscription
1792
Pennsylvania's canal era begins (1792–1931)
The Oracle of Dauphin, is first printed and published by John Wyeth and John W. Allen

19th century
1812 	Harrisburg becomes State Capital (seat of government for Pennsylvania)
1818	Construction begins on the original capitol building (finished 1822)
1820
 First bridge built at Harrisburg: The "Camelback Bridge" (a wooden, covered bridge). 
 Newspaper The Pennsylvania Intelligencer founded; it is not The Patriot-News
 Population: 2,990.
1822	Original Harrisburg State Capitol building completed (started 1818; burned Feb 1897)
1831	Cumberland Valley Railroad completed.
1833	Harrisburg Nail Works opens across the river
1834	Pennsylvania Canal opens at Harrisburg
1834	Dauphin Deposit Bank established.
1836	First train enters Harrisburg, operated by the Harrisburg, Mount Joy, and Lancaster RR
1837	Harrisburg's first railroad (RR) station built.
1839	Cumberland County RR Bridge goes into operation; would burn down in 1841.
1847   President James K. Polk appointed Jonas K. Rudy as the first letter carrier. 
1850
Harrisburg's first anthracite furnace built (Porter Furnace).
U.S. Census lists 1,376 dwellings and 7,834 people.
1851	The State Lunatic Hospital built in Harrisburg: One of the largest institutions in town
1852	Harrisburg Cotton Manufacturing Co built.
1853	Central Iron Works established in Harrisburg.
1854
Newspaper Pennsylvania Patriot established
Harrisburg YMCA established at the Market Square Church (formerly English Presbyterian Congregation).
Pennsylvania RR from Harrisburg to Pittsburgh (Main Line) is finished.
1857
Swatara (McCormack) Furnace built in South Hanover township nearby.
Much larger RR station is built
1858	First Reading RR train in Harrisburg.
1860
Harrisburg incorporated as a city.
West Harrisburg Market Company is formed by William K. Verbeke, which would become the Broad Street Market.
1861-65 City played active role in the Civil War; see Harrisburg in the American Civil War
1861
First horsecar operation: The Street Railway Company.
Camp Curtin established nearby: Large Union Army training ground.
1864	Lochiel Rolling Mill makes rails for RR.
1865-73 Expanded trolley lines (Capitol Area Transit)
1866	Paxton Rolling Mills built.
1867	Pennsylvania Steel Works, south of Harrisburg, was first in the US to produce steel ingots on order.
1869   Historical Society of Dauphin County is founded by leading citizens at a meeting in Market Square Presbyterian Church.
1873	
Horse-drawn passenger railway company opened
First street in Harrisburg is paved.
1875	Harrisburg and Middletown Omnibus Co. was organized to bring passengers to the trolley.
1877
Central Iron Works new plant built by Charles Bailey
City troops guard the arsenal upon the Great Railroad Strike of 1877.
1878	Telephones installed in Harrisburg.
1880
Steelton incorporated.
First lighting plant installed in Harrisburg by Thomas Edison
1885	Harrisburg's Centennial celebration
1886
First paved street. 
Chamber of Commerce established.
Single horse trolley to Allison Hill then expanded to Steelton.
1887
New RR station (Harrisburg Central Railroad Station) built on site of the first two.
New Cumberland County bridge is built.
1888 	First electric trolley service: Served Steelton, Allison Hill, expanded areas in Harrisburg.
1889
Market square market houses torn down.
YMCA Pennsylvania Railroad Branch established; moved to 611 Reily Street in 1903.
1890
Second bridge completed: the Walnut Street Bridge.
Harrisburg City Library opens on Market Square site.
1891	Mulberry St Bridge (#1) completed, encouraging building on Allison Hill: One of the first suburbs.
1892	End of the horse-drawn trolley. The second streetcar company was formed:  Line to Steelton – Oberlin and Harrisburg.
1893	First office building opens, the Dauphin Building.
1894	Trolley service crossed the Walnut Street “Peoples Bridge”. 
1896	Streetcar service expanded to New Cumberland, and along Simpson Ferry Road towards Mechanicsburg; also within Carlisle.
1896-1902	West Shore (of the Susquehanna River) lines expanded to include Boiling Springs, Newville, West Fairview, Enola, and Marysville.
1897	Original Harrisburg State Capitol building burned.
1898	33 different ethnicities counted in Harrisburg by special census

20th century
1900-1920	City Beautiful Movement; Mira Lloyd Dock calls for modern improvements and beautification.
1901	Pennsylvania Canal is closed.
1902
First automobile in city.
Camelback Bridge partially destroyed by flood.
Rockville Bridge built.
Vance McCormick elected mayor on reform ticket.
New water filter plant on City Island.
1903
Damaged Camelback bridge removed and replaced.
Hershey plant planned.
Trolley service expanded to Linglestown, Hummelstown, and Dauphin.   This required a consolidation of shops and car barns located at various places through the service area.
1904	100 passenger trains stop in the city each day.
1905
Market Street Bridge built in the place of the old Camelback Bridge.
First motion picture theater in Harrisburg.
City's first skyscraper built: United Trust Company.
1906  	New State Capitol building dedicated.
1907	Hershey Park opened
1910	Bellevue Park neighborhood opened: First planned neighborhood in Harrisburg and central PA.
1911	Rotary Club opened: First service club in Harrisburg
1912	Riverwalk construction begun.
1913
The transit company reorganized as "Harrisburg Railways".
Dock Street Dam is completed on the Susquehanna River
1914	City Beautiful continues, raises money with bonds (Eggert 338). City library opened.
1915	Great Migration brings many black workers to Harrisburg's steel mills
1916
Bethlehem Steel takes over PA Steel Co in Steelton
First Kipona Festival held
1918   Penn-Harris Hotel constructed (demolished in 1973)
1919   African-American YMCA branch established.
1920   The last trolleys were acquired.
1921	Island Park bathing beach has 235,000 visitors per year.
1924  
First radio station begins to broadcast.
Decline in trolley ridership began on both sides of the river.
1926	City Beautiful related projects, costing $250,000. Market Street Bridge widened from 2 lanes to four.
1926-30	 State Street Bridge built: part of the Capitol complex.
1929-1939	The Great Depression
1930	Bus service replaces trolley on the Carlisle to Mechanicsburg line west of the river.
1931	Pennsylvania's Canal era ends (1792–1931). Harrisburg Symphony Orchestra first plays.
1933   YMCA Central Branch opens on Front Street: Important architecture. Three trolley lines replaced by buses: Ten buses placed in service. Hotel Hershey opens. African-American YMCA branch builds Forster Street Branch.
1934    Bethesda Mission acquires building at 611 Reily Street from the PA Railroad YMCA.
1937
Hershey strike put down.
The trolley company changed to Harrisburg Railways Company and remained in use until 1973.
1938	All remaining trolley lines on west shore abandoned.
1939	July 16: Buses replace trolleys in Harrisburg. The last Harrisburg Railways Trolley closed. A fleet of 135 buses remained under the Harrisburg Railways Company.
1939-73 Bus service continued but riders lessened due to more auto ownership (Capitol Area Transit).
1941   Mansion of John Harris, Jr., and later Lincoln's first Secretary of War Simon Cameron becomes home of Historical Society of Dauphin County.
1943
Aircraft manufacturer Aircraft and Marine Products (AMP) moves to Harrisburg (now TE Connectivity).
New Dauphin County Courthouse opens: Art Deco.
1947	Merchant's and Men's Mutual Insurance moves to Front St.
1949	Pennsylvania national insurance group moves to new HQ on Derry St.
1950	89,554 people live in Harrisburg: Largest Standard Metropolitan Area population in city's history. Harrisburg Standard Metropolitan Area (SMA), consisting of Cumberland and Dauphin counties, was first defined.
1952	
Harvey Taylor Bridge opens to help traffic to west shore.  Forster St. widened.
1953
Hall Manor built.
1956	
Old Central Iron and Steel demolished for the anticipated John Harris Bridge.
1958
Dock Street and several streets are razed and 150 houses in Shipoke demolished for the anticipated John Harris Bridge.
IBM builds branch in Mechanicsburg, west of the river.
1959
Following a term change by the Bureau of the Budget (present-day Office of Management and Budget), the Harrisburg SMA became the Harrisburg Standard Metropolitan Statistical Area (SMSA).
 Urban renewal leads to the elimination of streets and houses around Midtown and Fox Ridge between North Sixth and Seventh streets for commercial redevelopment.
1960
Historic governor's mansion demolished for a parking lot.
John Harris Bridge on the river opened.
The Jackson-Lick projects, consisting of the C. Sylvester Jackson and Alton W. Lick towers, are built.
1960s	Olmstead Air Force Base closed.
1961
Harrisburg Expressway opened: Paxton Street to Hampden Township on the West Shore, via the John Harris Bridge.
1963   
Perry County added to the Harrisburg SMSA.
1964   
Commonwealth of PA razed the Forster Street Branch YMCA for government expansion
1966
Penn State opened campus on former Olmstead AFB.
The former Forster Street Branch YMCA occupies the newly constructed Camp Curtin Branch YMCA on 2135 North 6th Street.
1969  Protests and turmoil referred to as the "race riots" occur in the summer amid racial tensions among black and white communities
1972
Severe flooding resulting from Hurricane Agnes.
1973
Urban renewal demolished the Penn-Harris Hotel (built in 1918).
Public bus service acquired by the city from the Harrisburg Railways Company.
1974
Construction of the Cumberland Court apartments in Fox Ridge begins starting with the elimination of Cumberland Street east of Third Street, Hay Street, and Montgomery Streets.
1983	 Harrisburg SMSA renamed the Harrisburg–Lebanon–Carlisle Metropolitan Statistical Area (MSA)[3]; Lebanon County added to the MSA.
1996    Collapse of the West Shore portion of the Walnut Street Bridge as a result of rising flood waters from the North American blizzard of 1996.

21st century
2003	 MSA split into two separate metropolitan areas – Harrisburg–Carlisle metropolitan statistical area (Cumberland, Dauphin, and Perry counties) and the Lebanon Metropolitan Statistical Area (Lebanon County); both MSAs together form the Harrisburg–Carlisle metropolitan statistical area.
2010
After upset in the primary elections over long-time mayor Stephen R. Reed, first female and first black mayor Linda D. Thompson took office in January.  
The Harrisburg-York-Lebanon urban agglomeration area is defined for the first time, linking York County to the CSA.
2011   After filing for bankruptcy, a state-appointed receiver (William B. Lynch) took control of the City finances.
2013   Receiver Lynch released his comprehensive voluntary plan and it was enacted, where the budget became balanced again in the late 2010s.
2018   Mayor Eric R. Papenfuse began Vision Zero strategy for Harrisburg to eliminate pedestrian fatalities through more intelligent street planning. 
2020   Mayor Eric Papenfuse restructured the Harrisburg Bureau of Police to separately house its new Community Services Division and created new Community Service Aide positions in continued efforts to improve community policing.
2022   Final payment of $125.6 million in debt (including interest) incurred by former mayor Stephen Reed in 1997 from Series D and F bonds was finally repaid after 25 years, setting the City up to be debt free the following year.

References

Further reading
 Eggert, Gerald G. Harrisburg industrializes: the coming of factories to an American Community (1993) 412 pages
 Ries, Linda A. Harrisburg (2006) excerpt and text search
 Seitz, Blair. Harrisburg: renaissance of a capital city (Historic Harrisburg Association, 2000)

Harrisburg